1895 in the Philippines details events of note that happened in the Philippines in the year 1895.

Incumbents

 Governor-General: Ramón Blanco y Erenas

Events
 January 1 – First ever local elections were held as per the Maura Law passed in 1893.
 January 15 – The first issue of the Boletin del Museo-Biblioteca de Filipinas (Bulletin of the Museum-Library of the Philippines) is published.
 January 23 – Philippine Regional Exposition was held in Manila, wherein Governor-General Blanco declares a great future predestined for the Philippines.

Holidays
As a colony of Spanish Empire and being a catholic colony, the following were considered holidays:
 January 1 – New Year's Day
 April 11 – Maundy Thursday
 April 12 – Good Friday
 December 25 – Christmas Day

Births
January 13 – Vivencio Cuyugan, Filipino boxer and politician (d. 1971)
March 23 – Encarnacion Alzona, Filipino historian and educator (d. 2001)
December 13 – Victorio Edades, Filipino painter (d. 1985)

Deaths
March 10 – Amai Pakpak, Maranao leader

References